Dean Allison  (born February 18, 1965, in London, Ontario) is a Canadian politician. He was elected to the House of Commons of Canada in the 2004 federal election for the riding of Niagara West—Glanbrook, now Niagara West. Allison is a member of the Conservative Party of Canada and has been re-elected in each subsequent election.

Early life and career

Allison was born on February 18, 1965, in London, Ontario. Allison holds a degree in Economics from Wilfrid Laurier University. Upon graduation, Allison established himself in the Niagara area through accumulating businesses and working for a major franchise organization. Outside of his capacities as a Member of Parliament, Allison also owns a private equity firm that assists in small business and startups.

Community involvement

Allison has served as president of the West Lincoln Memorial Hospital Foundation, as president of the Lincoln Chamber of Commerce, a director of the Ontario Trillium Foundation, and board member of Junior Achievement in Niagara. Allison is also a founding member of the Dave Thomas Foundation for Adoption in Canada and the Belarus' Children of Chernobyl program that brings children affected by the Chernobyl disaster to Canada.

Political career
Allison first ran for federal politics as the Canadian Alliance candidate in the Erie-Lincoln riding in 2000. Allison received 37.1% of the vote but was defeated by Liberal candidate John Maloney who received 42.2% of the votes.

Allison ran, and was elected, in the 2004 election as the Conservative candidate for Niagara West-Glanbrook. Allison has won the subsequent federal elections for Niagara West-Glanbrook.

In 2015, as a result of riding redistribution, the name was changed to Niagara West. The riding now consists of Grimsby, Lincoln, West Lincoln, Wainfleet, Pelham and a portion of west St. Catharines. In the 2021 federal election, Allison won his seventh consecutive election and returned to the House of Commons as the MP for Niagara West.

Member of Parliament

Since taking office, Allison has served on the Standing Committee on Public Accounts, International Trade and as past chair of the Standing Committee on Human Resources Skills Development and Status of Persons with Disabilities and has also served on the advisory panel on the Funding of Officers of Parliament. He has also served as vice chair of the Ontario Conservative Caucus and been on the executive of the Intraparliamentary Union Association and the Commonwealth Association.

In the 42nd Parliament, Allison served as the Shadow Minister for International Trade as well as the vice-chair of Standing Committee on International Trade.

Allison is also a director of the Organization for Security and Cooperation in Europe Parliamentary Assembly.

Allison has tabled a number of different legislative initiatives in Parliament including a bill aimed at removing the faint hope clause from the Criminal Code, and motions to entrench property rights in the Canadian Charter of Rights and Freedoms and to raise awareness of Anaphylaxis.

Allison was one of thirteen Canadians banned from traveling to Russia under retaliatory sanctions imposed by Russian President Vladimir Putin in March 2014.

After the House of Commons introduced a vaccine mandate, Allison claimed a medical exemption. He attended House meetings virtually.

In February 2023, Allison, along with fellow Conservative MPs Leslyn Lewis and Colin Carrie, had dinner with Christine Anderson, a Member of the European Parliament representing Alternative for Germany, who was on a Canadian tour of right-wing media and convoy protest supporters. The meeting was condemned by the Centre for Israel and Jewish Affairs, the Canadian Anti-Hate Network, and Prime Minister Justin Trudeau among others, for Anderson and AfD's Islamophobic and antisemitic positions. Conservative leader Pierre Poilievre also denounced Anderson's views as "vile", racist, and said that "it would be better if Anderson never visited Canada in the first place". The three MPs released a joint-statement saying that while meetings with foreign elected officials are ordinary, they were unaware of her or her party's views, and that they condemned racist and hateful views.

Electoral record

Source: Elections Canada

Source: Elections Canada

Broadcasting career 
Allison hosts a weekly program on the conservative-leaning news channel The News Forum, The Hill Update.

References

External links
 Dean Allison
 How'd They Vote?: Dean Allison's voting history and quotes
 

1965 births
Living people
Members of the House of Commons of Canada from Ontario
Conservative Party of Canada MPs
Wilfrid Laurier University alumni
People from the Regional Municipality of Niagara
Politicians from London, Ontario
21st-century Canadian politicians